Go West is the debut studio album by English pop duo Go West, released in 1985 by Chrysalis Records. The album brought the band into the limelight, scoring them a string of top 40 hits in the UK and New Zealand. "We Close Our Eyes" was the most successful single, reaching No. 4 in New Zealand and No. 5 in the UK. The album itself reached No. 8 in the UK.

A super deluxe edition was released on 6 May 2022 packaged as a 4 CD+DVD box set, newly remastered by original producer Gary Stevenson from the original production tapes. It features the original album, a slightly expanded version of Bangs & Crashes, demos & rarities (including additional remixes), an unreleased live performance from Hammersmith Odeon on 21 November 1985, a DVD featuring all promo clips for the singles of the album, a never before seen 1985 live performance from Yokohama and various live television appearances.

Background
Go West, formed in London by Peter Cox and Richard Drummie, had been writing songs for the album since 1982. Two songs featured on the album, "We Close Our Eyes" and "Call Me", helped them land a record deal with Chrysalis Records.

The album features more top 40 UK/New Zealand hits than any other albums and helped them to be voted Best Newcomers at the 1986 Brit Awards.

The song "Goodbye Girl" was featured in the first episode of the second season of the 1980s TV series Miami Vice.

The song "Call Me" is included on the soundtrack for the popular 2002 video game Grand Theft Auto: Vice City, on the fictional in-game radio station "Flash FM" and on the official soundtrack release.

Track listing

2022 super deluxe edition

Personnel 
Go West
 Peter Cox – vocals, keyboards, guitars
 Richard Drummie – vocals, keyboards, bass

Guest musicians
 Dave West – keyboards, linguistaphone, additional arrangements
 Neil Drake – acoustic piano solo on "Missing Persons"
 Alan Murphy – guitars, guitar solos
 Gary Stevenson – guitars
 Pino Palladino – fretless bass
 Graham Broad – drums, percussion
 Timmy Goldsmith – drums
 Mel Collins – saxophone
 Katie Humble – backing vocals

Production 
 Gary Stevenson – producer, engineer
 Drostyn John Madden – engineer
 Barry Hammond – engineer
 Keith Finney – engineer
 Mike Drake – assistant engineer
 Neil Drake – assistant engineer
 Rooster Studios, London – recording location
 Chipping Norton Recording Studios, Oxfordshire – recording location
 Sarm West Studios – mixing location
 George Marino – mastering at Sterling Sound (New York).
 All songs written by Go West
 Published by ATV Music Ltd

Design 
 Photography – Brian Griffin
 Illustrations – Nick Hardcastle
 Sleeve concept and design – John Pasche, Paul Whymant-Morris and Go West.
 Art direction – John Pasche
 Lyrics reproduced courtesy of ATV Music Ltd

Charts

Weekly charts

Year-end charts

Singles

Certifications

References

1985 debut albums
Go West (band) albums
Chrysalis Records albums